Lunar Orbiter 5, the last of the "Lunar Orbiter series", was designed to take additional Apollo and Surveyor landing site photography and to take broad survey images of unphotographed parts of the Moon's far side. It was also equipped to collect selenodetic, radiation intensity, and micrometeoroid impact data and was used to evaluate the Manned Space Flight Network tracking stations and Apollo Orbit Determination Program.

Mission summary
The spacecraft was placed in a cislunar trajectory and on August 5, 1967 was injected into an elliptical near polar lunar orbit  with an inclination of 85 degrees and a period of 8 hours 30 minutes.

The spacecraft acquired photographic data from August 6 to 18, 1967, and readout occurred until August 27, 1967. Accurate data were acquired from all other experiments throughout the mission. The spacecraft was tracked until it struck the lunar surface on command at 2.79 degrees S latitude, 83 degrees W longitude (selenographic coordinates) on January 31, 1968.

Features on the near side of the Moon that were photographic targets included Petavius, Hyginus, Messier, Tycho, Copernicus, Gassendi, Vitello, Mons Gruithuisen Gamma, Prinz, Aristarchus, Vallis Schroteri, Marius Hills, Montes Apenninus, Rimae Plato, Sinus Aestuum, Hipparchus, Rimae Sulpicius Gallus, Rimae Calippus, Censorinus, Dionysius, and the future landing site of Apollo 11.

See also

 Lunar Orbiter Image Recovery Project
 Exploration of the Moon
 Lunar Orbiter 1
 Lunar Orbiter 2
 Lunar Orbiter 3
 Lunar Orbiter 4
 List of artificial objects on the Moon

References

5
Spacecraft launched in 1967
Spacecraft that orbited the Moon
Spacecraft that impacted the Moon
1968 on the Moon